Ashianak (also Romanized as Āshīānak and Āshyānak; also known as Ashnak) is a village in Shahsavan Kandi Rural District, in the Central District of Saveh County, Markazi Province, Iran. At the 2006 census, its population was 32, in 13 families.

References 

Populated places in Saveh County